Markit Ltd. was a British financial information and services company.

Markit may also refer to:

 Markit, Iran (disambiguation)
 Markit Purchasing Managers' Index, an economic indicator derived from monthly surveys of private sector companies
 IHS Markit, an American-British information provider
 KM-MARKIT (born 1976), Japanese singer

See also
 Market (disambiguation)